Christopher Howard Wolf (born September 21, 1979) is an American independent game developer and writer. He is the founder of independent game company WRONG Games, for which he works as a game designer. He is known for work on the games DragonSpires, I'm O.K - A Murder Simulator, Hell Rising, and Scroll Wars. He also authored a graphic novel retelling the story of Nosferatu, and has appeared on Dawson's Creek and in the English dubbing of You're Under Arrest!. Currently, he now runs a horror story website called "Slimebeast", which has released several Creepypastas including Funnymouth, Whimsywood, Lost Episodes, its sequel Sid's Video, Abandoned by Disney, its sequels Room Zero and Corruptus, and prequel A Few Suggestions.

Games
In 1997, then 17-year-old Wolf and Adam Maloy took over production on DragonSpires, a community-driven multiplayer game initiated by Dragon's Eye Productions. Wolf served as creative administrator of the game, in charge of producing a storyline and pixel art, among other duties, until 2002. In a much smaller capacity, Wolf also assisted independent game maker Derek Yu with games such as Mean Cuisine and I'm O.K - A Murder Simulator, which was an ultra-violent game based on Jack Thompson's "A Modest Proposal".

DragonSpires later served as the inspiration for Wolf's browser-based multiplayer game, Scroll Wars, which was opened to the public in 2006. One year later in 2007, Wolf also opened Hell Rising, a zombie vs. vampire vs. survivor browser-based game inspired by and building upon its predecessor, Urban Dead.

Christopher maintains a YouTube gaming channel under the name Tormental, and has worked on creative material for LordMinion777.

Comics
In 2008, Wolf authored a well-received installment in Josh Howard presents: Sasquatch published by Viper Comics. He also authored a graphic novel retelling the 1922 film Nosferatu for a modern audience and a creator-owned series titled Love Monster.

Additionally, he wrote, illustrated, and created the webcomic Escapeman for ten years and wrote reviews for Pop Thought. His fan page for The Atomics by Mike Allred also appeared in Wizard Magazine.

Wolf was named Marketing Director of Viper Comics in late 2010. His duties for Viper have included creating a viral marketing website for Inspector Gadget.

Acting
Wolf was a voice actor for the English dub of the Anime series You're Under Arrest! and appeared on episodes of Dawson's Creek, most notably as a sideburned student in an episode spoofing The Blair Witch Project.

Slimebeast
Wolf runs an online horror story forum called "Slimebeast," going under the same pen name, and is known for writing the following Creepypasta stories:
 Funnymouth - A young man comes across a mysterious forumgoer named "Funnymouth" who appears to take an interest in him. A companion site exists on the Internet based on the main character's chat server (although the display notes it is under maintenance). Refreshing the page will redirect the user to an image of a giant pixelated face with a limp tongue slogging out (all developed by repeating text of Funnymouth). It is assumed in-story this is Funnymouth itself.
 Whimsywood - A boy discovers a theme park called Whimsywood that hides a vicious secret that bodes ill for visiting children.
 Lost Episodes - A young man reflects on his fleeting childhood friendship with a boy named Sid who had created several re-cut tapes of popular features, which progressively become more grim and violent. Returning to him later on, Sid is revealed to have killed his own family and retreated into a fantasy video world of his own, much to the main character's horror. A sequel story called Sid's Video involves another person discovering Sid's videotape, as it unleashes havoc on the man's personal video collection.
 Abandoned by Disney - Inspired by the story of the abandoned River Country Disney park and Discovery Island locations, the story covers the dangers behind an abandoned Jungle Book-themed resort named Mowgli's Palace. The follow-up Room Zero discusses the stories behind employees connected with the Disney Corporation; including tourists wearing Disney-themed gas masks and a bomb shelter located deep beneath the park. Another follow-up, Corruptus, delves into further detail on the origins of the bizarre events and locations and how they are seemingly linked to the "wish upon a star" sentiment spread throughout Disney media itself. A prequel story also exists called A Few Suggestions, which is written in recollections of notes from a suggestion box in Mowgli's Palace (and also reveals the supposed origin of the color-inverted Mickey Mouse costume from the original story's climax). Wolf has also rewritten the story as 'Dandyland' to remove specific mentions of Disney-related content.

References

External links

1979 births
Living people
American comics writers
MUD developers
People from Mount Kisco, New York
Video game designers
Indie video game developers
Weird fiction writers